The Transactions of the American Mathematical Society is a monthly peer-reviewed scientific journal of mathematics published by the American Mathematical Society. It was established in 1900. As a requirement, all articles must be more than 15 printed pages.

See also 
 Bulletin of the American Mathematical Society
 Journal of the American Mathematical Society
 Memoirs of the American Mathematical Society
 Notices of the American Mathematical Society
 Proceedings of the American Mathematical Society

External links
 
 Transactions of the American Mathematical Society on JSTOR

American Mathematical Society academic journals
Mathematics journals
Publications established in 1900